Muzaffarnagar district is a district of Uttar Pradesh state in northern India.  It is part of Saharanpur division. The city of Muzaffarnagar is the district headquarters. This district is the part of National Capital Region.

History

Medieval period
Muzaffarnagar's early medieval history is obscure till the Indo-Mughal period. Timur's army had marched to Delhi through this region in 1399; its people fought it unsuccessfully. In Mughal Emperor Akbar's time, most of the Muzaffarnagar district region, called Sarwat then under the Mahal control of Tagas / Tyagis of Sarvat village, belonged to the sarkar (circle) of Saharanpur. Akbar bestowed pargana of Sarwat on Sayyed Mahmud Khan Barha which remained with his descendants up to the 17th century. After killing Peer Khan Lodi styled as Khan Jahan lodi, Shahjahan bestowed title of deceased Peer Khan Lodhi and Pargana of Sarwat on Sayyed Muzaffar Khan Barha, whose son Munawwar Lashkar Khan Barha established the city and named it Muzaffarnagar in honour of his father, and Sarwat also became Muzaffarnagar.

Modern era
Muzaffarnagar district gained notoriety in the 20th century with frequent incidents of loot, murders, kidnappings and dacoity.

Blocks
The district is divided into 9 blocks, these are:

Demographics

According to the 2011 census Muzaffarnagar district has a population of 4,143,512  roughly equal to the nation of Lebanon or the US state of Oregon. This gives it a ranking of 125th in India (out of a total of 640). Its population growth rate over the decade 2001-2011 was  16.8%. Muzaffarnagar has a sex ratio of 886 females for every 1000 males, and a literacy rate of 70.11%. Minority population is about 40% of the total population of the district.

The divided district had population 2,869,934. Scheduled Castes made up 419,987 (14.63%) of the population respectively.

At the time of the 2011 Census of India, 86.28% of the population of the district spoke Hindi and 13.29% Urdu as their first language.

Education 
Muzaffarnagar Medical College, affiliate of Chaudhary Charan Singh University

Villages 
 

Adampur Mouchri
Mahaljana

References

External links
 

 
Districts of Uttar Pradesh
Minority Concentrated Districts in India